The 2014 Petra Kvitová tennis season officially began at the 2014 Apia International Sydney.

Yearly summary

Early hard court season and Australian Open

Sydney International
Kvitová started her season in Sydney. As the second seed, she received a bye into the second round. There, she defeated qualifier Christina Mchale before going to on to beat compatriot Lucie Šafářová in the last eight. In the semifinal, Kvitová suffered a shocking loss to qualifier and eventual champion Tsvetana Pironkova in straight sets.

Australian Open
Seeded sixth at the Australian Open, Kvitová drew world No. 88 Luksika Kumkhum in the opening round, and was upset by the Thai in three sets. It was Kvitová's earliest exit at a Grand Slam since 2011 US Open.

Middle East series

Qatar Open
As the third seed at the Qatar Open, Kvitová received a bye in the first round. In the second round she faced former world No. 1 Venus Williams, whom she beat in three sets. She then saw off Šafářová in the round of 16, before losing to Jelena Janković in the quarterfinals.

Dubai Tennis Championships
Kvitová failed to defend her title in Dubai, losing her opening match to Spain's Carla Suárez Navarro in three sets.

North American hard court season

Indian Wells Masters

At the 2014 BNP Paribas Open, Kvitová was seeded eighth and won her first two matches against Coco Vandeweghe and Svetlana Kuznetsova, but lost in the fourth round to Dominika Cibulková in straight sets.

Miami Masters

Kvitová was the eighth seed at the Miami Open and she reached the quarterfinals of the event for the first time in her career, having never advanced beyond third round previously. She defeated Paula Ormaechea and Donna Vekić to set up a clash with 12th seed Ana Ivanovic in the last 16. Despite losing the first set, Kvitová then double-bagelled the Serb to take the match. In the last eight, she lost to Maria Sharapova in straight sets.

Fed Cup semifinal

In her first match, Kvitová was pitted against young Italian Camila Giorgi and she won in straight sets. In the following round, she avenged her loss to Roberta Vinci from last year by defeating the veteran in straight sets as well.

Clay court season

Stuttgart Open
Kvitová, seeded third at the Stuttgart Open, suffered a shocking loss in the second round to former top 30 player Alisa Kleybanova.

Madrid Open

Seeded fifth at the Mutua Madrid Open, Kvitová won her opener against Sorana Cîrstea in three sets. Then, she defeated Varvara Lepchenko and Šafářová to reach the quarterfinals where she was supposed to play world no. 1 Serena Williams. However, her opponent conceded a walkover and Kvitová moved into semifinals where she lost to Simona Halep in three sets.

Italian Open
At the Italian Open, fifth-seeded Kvitová was defeated in her opening match by Zhang Shuai in three sets

French Open
At the French Open, Kvitová comfortably won over Zarina Diyas and Marina Erakovic in the first two rounds, before facing former champion Svetlana Kuznetsova. There, she fell to the Russian in a tight three-setter.

Grass court season

Eastbourne
Kvitová started her grass court campaign in Eastbourne. She defeated compatriot Šafářová and Lepchenko to reach the quarterfinals, where she was forced to withdraw with a hamstring injury.

Wimbledon
Kvitová entered the Wimbledon Championships as a heavy favourite, having won her maiden Grand Slam title here in 2011. After winning the first two rounds against Andrea Hlaváčková and Mona Barthel comfortably, Kvitová faced former champion Venus Williams in the third round. Similar to their Doha encounter, Kvitová was pushed to a third set. The decider featured both players playing well, with the Czech ultimately sailing through.

Kvitová secured her berth in the last eight by defeating Peng Shuai in the following round. She then beat compatriots Barbora Záhlavová-Strýcová and Šafářová in the quarterfinals and semifinals respectively. In the final, Kvitová completely outplayed 13th seed and maiden finalist Eugenie Bouchard in only 55 minutes. The match was the fifth-shortest women's final match in the tournament history.

US Open Series

Canadian Open
Kvitová officially began her US Open series campaign in Montreal. After receiving a bye in the opening round, she defeated Casey Dellacqua in her opener but then lost to eventual semifinalist Ekaterina Makarova in three sets.

Cincinnati Masters
At the Cincinnati Masters, Kvitová lost to Elina Svitolina in her opening match in straight sets.

Connecticut Open
Kvitová entered New Haven as the second seed. She defeated Makarova in straight sets in her opening match and the quarterfinals, she beat Záhlavová-Strýcová. She reached the final for the third straight year when she overcame Samantha Stosur in the last four. In the final, she faced Magdaléna Rybáriková whom she defeated in straight sets to for the title.

US Open
Kvitová was seeded third at the US Open. In the first round, she defeated France's Kristina Mladenovic. She then beat fellow Czech Petra Cetkovská. She then lost in the third round for the second straight year, this time to Serbian Aleksandra Krunić in straight sets.

Asian swing & WTA Finals

Wuhan Open
Kvitová cruised into the third round of the Wuhan Open with a win over Italian Karin Knapp. She then booked her spot in the quarterfinals with a three-set victory over compatriot Karolína Plíšková. In the last eight, she went on to defeat Frenchwoman Caroline Garcia and set up a semifinal clash with Svitolina, whom she lost to in Cincinnati in August, but Kvitová was too good this time, beating her straight sets to reach the final, where she defeated Eugenie Bouchard to win the inaugural title of the tournament.

China Open
Kvitová next played at the China Open where she was the third seed. She defeated Peng in her opening match and reached the quarterfinals after a walkover from Venus Williams. She then beat Vinci in straight sets before moving past Stosur in the last four in a three-set battle. In the final, she suffered a defeat at the hands of Sharapova.

WTA Finals
Kvitová was the third seed at the WTA Finals and was drawn into the same group as Sharapova, Agnieszka Radwańska and Caroline Wozniacki. She lost her first match against Radwańska in straight sets but then went on to upset Sharapova in straight sets, thus recording her first victory over the Russian in five attempts. Her hopes of qualifying for the semifinals were dashed when she lost to Wozniacki, finishing last in her group as a result.

Fed Cup final

Kvitová represented her home country where they faced Germany. In the opening rubber, she defeated Andrea Petkovic in straight sets. As a result of compatriot Šafářová winning the second match, the team was one win away from the title and all hopes were on Kvitová. She faced Angelique Kerber in her next match and won in tight three sets, thus helping Czech Republic claim its third Fed Cup title in four years.

All matches

Singles matches

Yearly records

Head-to-head matchups
Ordered by number of wins, as of Fed Cup final

  Lucie Šafářová 5–0
  Barbora Záhlavová Strýcová 2–0
  Venus Williams 2–0
  Varvara Lepchenko 2–0
  Peng Shuai 2–0
  Eugenie Bouchard 2–0
  Roberta Vinci 2–0
  Samantha Stosur 2–0
  Christina McHale 1–0
  Coco Vandeweghe 1–0
  Paula Ormaechea 1–0
  Donna Vekić 1–0
  Ana Ivanovic 1–0
  Angelique Kerber 1–0
  Andrea Petkovic 1–0
  Zarina Diyas 1–0
  Marina Erakovic 1–0
  Andrea Hlaváčková 1–0
  Mona Barthel 1–0
  Sorana Cîrstea 1–0
  Casey Dellacqua 1–0
  Camila Giorgi 1–0
  Magdaléna Rybáriková 1–0
  Ekaterina Makarova 1–1
  Svetlana Kuznetsova 1–1
  Elina Svitolina 1–1
  Caroline Wozniacki 0–1
  Agnieszka Radwańska 0–1
  Alisa Kleybanova 0–1
  Jelena Janković 0–1
  Tsvetana Pironkova 0–1
  Luksika Kumkhum 0–1
  Carla Suárez Navarro 0–1
  Dominika Cibulková 0–1
  Simona Halep 0–1
  Shuai Zhang 0–1
  Maria Sharapova 1–2

Finals

Singles: 4 (3–1)

See also
2014 Maria Sharapova tennis season
2014 Li Na tennis season
2014 Serena Williams tennis season
2014 WTA Tour

References

Kvitova, Petra
Petra Kvitova tennis seasons
Petra Kvitova tennis season